Nathan Cross (born December 2, 1980) is a Canadian bobsledder who has competed since 2007. He won the silver medal in the mixed bobsleigh-skeleton team event at the 2008 FIBT World Championships in Altenberg, Germany.

References
FIBT profile

1980 births
Living people
Canadian male bobsledders